The year 2000 is the 4th year in the history of the Pride Fighting Championships, a mixed martial arts promotion based in Japan. 2000 had 6 events beginning with, Pride FC - Grand Prix 2000: Opening Round.

Debut Pride FC fighters

The following fighters fought their first Pride FC fight in 2000:

 Dan Henderson
 Gilbert Yvel
 Hans Nijman
 Heath Herring
 Herman Renting
 Igor Borisov
 Johil de Oliveira
 John Marsh

 John Renken
 Kazuyuki Fujita
 Ken Shamrock
 Masaaki Satake
 Mike Bourke
 Osamu Kawahara
 Ricardo Almeida
 Ricco Rodriguez

 Royce Gracie
 Ryan Gracie
 Shannon Ritch
 Takayuki Okada
 Tokimitsu Ishizawa
 Tra Telligman
 Willie Peeters
 Yoshiaki Yatsu

Events list

Pride FC: Grand Prix 2000 - Opening Round

Pride FC - Grand Prix 2000: Opening Round was an event held on January 30, 2000 at The Tokyo Dome in Tokyo, Japan.

Results

Pride 2000 Grand Prix Bracket

Pride FC: Grand Prix 2000 - Finals

Pride FC - Pride Grand Prix 2000: Finals was an event held on May 1, 2000 at The Tokyo Dome in Tokyo, Japan.

Results

Pride 2000 Grand Prix Bracket

Pride 9: New Blood

Pride 9 - New Blood was an event held on June 4, 2000 at The Nagoya Rainbow Hall in Nagoya, Japan.

Results

Pride 10: Return of the Warriors

Pride 10 - Return of the Warriors was an event held on August 27, 2000 at The Seibu Dome in Saitama, Japan.

Results

Pride 11: Battle of the Rising Sun

Pride 11 - Battle of the Rising Sun was an event held on October 31, 2000 at Osaka-jo Hall in Osaka, Japan.

Results

Pride 12: Cold Fury

Pride 12 - Cold Fury was an event held on December 23, 2000 at The Saitama Super Arena in Saitama, Japan. This event featured the debut of future PRIDE Champion, Dan Henderson.

Results

See also
 Pride Fighting Championships
 List of Pride Fighting Championships champions
 List of Pride Fighting events

References

Pride Fighting Championships events
2000 in mixed martial arts